Immortal Gentleman is a 1935 British historical drama film directed by Widgey R. Newman and starring Basil Gill, Rosalinde Fuller and Dennis Hoey. It was a low-budget B film, which usually did not have historical settings.

Synopsis
In the early seventeenth century William Shakespeare, Ben Jonson and Michael Drayton meet in a Southwark tavern and begin discussing the other customers who remind them of characters from Shakespeare's plays.

Cast
 Basil Gill as William Shakespeare / Malvolio  
 Rosalinde Fuller as Ophelia / Juliet / Lady  
 Dennis Hoey as Soldier / Toby Belch  
 Anne Bolt as Jane / Maria  
 Edgar Owen as Ben Jonson / Mercutio  
 Hubert Leslie as Michael Drayton 
 Laidman Browne as Gambler / Petruchio / Feste  
 Terence de Marney as Harry Morton / Hamlet / Romeo  
 Derrick De Marney as James Carter / Tybalt  
 Fred Rains as Miser  
 Dennis Wyndham as Voyager  
 Ivan Berlyn as Father / Aguecheek  
 Leo Genn as Merchant / Shylock  
 Roy Byford as Squire 
 Noel Birkin
 Peggy Bolton
 Bertram Dench

References

Bibliography
 Low, Rachael. Filmmaking in 1930s Britain. George Allen & Unwin, 1985.
 Wood, Linda. British Films, 1927-1939. British Film Institute, 1986.

External links

1935 films
Films directed by Widgey R. Newman
1930s historical drama films
British historical drama films
Films set in London
Films set in the 1600s
British black-and-white films
1935 drama films
Quota quickies
1930s English-language films
1930s British films